Legio I Parthica (Latin for "1st Parthian Legion") was a legion of the Imperial Roman army founded in AD 197 by the emperor Septimius Severus (r. 193–211) for his forthcoming war against Parthia. The legion's presence in the Middle East is recorded until the early 5th century.

The legions I, II, and III Parthica were levied by Septimius Severus for his campaign against the Parthian Empire. After the success of this campaign, I and III Parthica remained in the region, in the camp of Singara (Sinjar, Iraq), in Mesopotamia, to prevent subsequent rebellions and to guard the eastern provinces from attacks from the Parthian Empire.

Legionaries from I Parthica were usually sent to other provinces, namely Lycia, Cilicia and Cyrenaica.

In 360, I Parthica unsuccessfully defended its camp against a Sasanid attack; after the defeat, the legion was moved to Nisibis (modern Turkey), where it remained until the city was surrendered by emperor Jovian to the Sassanid Persians in 363. After that, the legion was moved to Constantina, where it is last mentioned in the 5th century.

The legion emblem was the centaur.

See also
List of Roman legions
Roman legion

External links
livius.org account of Legio I Parthica

01 Parthica
197 establishments
Military units and formations established in the 2nd century
Septimius Severus
Roman–Parthian Wars
Roman–Persian Wars
190s establishments in the Roman Empire
190s establishments